Dethalbum II is the second full length album by virtual band Dethklok, from the animated series Metalocalypse. The CD and deluxe CD/DVD were released on September 29, 2009. The album was later released on LP to the United States and Canada.

Background
The album was recorded at Bombshelter Studios and "The Danger Zone" in Los Angeles. The deluxe edition includes a bonus DVD with 52 minutes of never-before-released music videos featured in the 2008 Dethklok tour. Two bonus tracks were originally promised for the deluxe edition of the album; however, Brendon Small had never recorded or planned to include bonus tracks. The announcement was a marketing error. A guitar transcription book of this album was released through Alfred Music Publishing. Six tracks from this album are included in the Dethklok bass tab anthology.

Other media appearances
"Laser Cannon Deth Sentence" is featured as a downloadable track for Guitar Hero 5. "Bloodlines" is featured as a playable track in Guitar Hero: Warriors of Rock. The song "The Cyborg Slayers" was featured in the soundtrack for the game Saints Row: The Third.

Reception

The album peaked at number 15 on the Billboard 200 chart and sold 45,000 copies in its first week of release.

Track listing

Personnel

Virtual personnel from Metalocalypse
 Nathan Explosion – vocals, lyricist
 Pickles the Drummer – drums
 Skwisgaar Skwigelf – lead guitar
 Toki Wartooth – rhythm guitar
 William Murderface – bass

Production
 Dethklok – production
 Dick "Magic Ears" Knubbler – production
 Charles Offdensen – legal

Actual personnel
 Brendon Small – guitars, keyboards, vocals, bass, production
 Gene Hoglan – drums
 Bryan Beller – bass ("The Gears")

Production
 Ulrich Wild – production, engineering, mixing (at "Noize in the Attic")
 Assistant engineered by Mike Gerlach – assistant engineering
 Raidar – assistant mixing
 Dave Collins Mastering (Los Angeles, CA) – mastering
 Antonio Canobbio – cover artwork

References

2009 albums
Dethklok albums
Williams Street Records albums
Albums produced by Ulrich Wild